The 1979 Winston GT season was the 9th season of the IMSA GT Championship auto racing series.  It was a series for GTX class Group 5 cars and GTO and GTU class Grand tourer cars.  It began February 3, 1979, and ended November 25, 1979, after fifteen rounds.

Schedule
Not all classes participated in shorter events.  Races marked with All had all classes on track at the same time.

Season results

External links
 World Sports Racing Prototypes - 1979 IMSA GT Championship results

IMSA GT Championship seasons
IMSA GT